Amir Ahmad Wilson (born 6 February 2004) is an English actor. He played Will Parry in the HBO and BBC One series His Dark Materials, Tiuri in the Netflix series The Letter for the King, and Dickon in the 2020 film adaptation of The Secret Garden.

Personal life
Wilson was born in Shrewsbury, Shropshire to English father, Paul, and Sudanese mother, Nagla. He has an older sister, Iman. He grew up in the suburb of Monkmoor, attending St. Giles' C of E Primary School. Wilson began acting and training with local theatre group Get Your Wigle On.

His father died in May 2018.

Filmography

Stage

Awards and nominations

References

External links

Living people
2004 births
21st-century English male actors
Actors from Shrewsbury
Black British male actors
English male child actors
English people of Sudanese descent